Creative Commons Hungary (2008-2017) has been a non-profit organization placed in Budapest, Hungary The self-organized society established in 2008. The founders were gathered together from an online mailing-list, which was created for discussing about copyrights of artists, opportunity of copyleft and other Libre culture themes.

When most of the original leaders have left Hungary or became non active the association slowly eroded. It has been deleted from the official registry on 6 February 2017.

Foundation 

In 2008 the founders were:
 Bodó Balázs (first chairman)
 Dankaházi Lóránt
 Fehér János
 Kelényi Attila
 Maróy Ákos
 Máté Norbert
 Molnár Rita
 Szervác Attila
 Szemes Balázs
 Tóth Márton
 Zrínyi Dániel

The main goal of the Creative Commons Hungary was support non-profit culture sector and the provide to spread of Creative Commons Licenses in Hungary.

The Board 
In 2013 the Board of Creative Commons consisted of:

 Attila Szervác (chairman)
 Dankaházi Lóránt
 Hollós Roland
 Horváth Zsuzsanna
 Molnár Attila

Activity 
There were declared programs for partnering and co-operation to support goals of Creative Commons Hungary:
 Libre culture program (2013), founding the Libre art movement, 2014–2015
 Public domain program (2013)

References

 Creative Commons Hungary homepage 
 Charter of Creative Commons Hungary 
 Creative commons mailing list
 CC Hungary on Commons

Creative Commons
Organisations based in Hungary
Libre art
Libre culture